Janice Connolly  is an English actress, comedian and artistic director. She runs the Birmingham-based group Women and Theatre, and performs stand-up comedy as her character Mrs Barbara Nice. Connolly has also appeared in Coronation Street, That Peter Kay Thing, Phoenix Nights, Max and Paddy's Road To Nowhere, Thin Ice and Dead Man Weds. She has also worked at the Birmingham Rep with Roxanna Silbert as artistic director, and in 2017, Connolly was awarded a British Empire Medal in the New Years Honours list for services to community arts in the West Midlands. In 2022, Connolly appeared in the BBC soap opera Doctors as Rosie Colton.

Early life
Connolly was born in Stockport in 1954. She left to study drama at Birmingham Polytechnic (now Birmingham City University). After graduating she became a drama teacher and a social worker for Barnardos.

Barbara Nice
Connolly is best known for her character Barbara Nice - a caricature of a middle aged housewife and mother of five from Kings Heath, Birmingham. Her act is heavily reliant on interaction with the audience, for example acting as an agony aunt to the audience. She performs on the comedy circuit as a headline act and has performed one woman shows across the UK. She appeared as Barbara Nice in solo shows at the Edinburgh Festival Fringe in 2012, 2014 and 2018 

In October 2015, Connolly recorded a pilot for BBC Radio 2's Comedy Showcase series, which was made available on the BBC iPlayer in November before being broadcast later that month. The BBC said: "Barbara is worried she and Ken (played by John Henshaw) are at risk of adding to the numbers of silver splitters - they have nothing in common; Ken's idea of retirement involves a marathon session of Pointless and that doesn't fit with Barbara's idea of a well-spent golden age."
The pilot was well received with 4 episodes commissioned and subsequently broadcast in March 2017.

In September 2016, Connolly performed at the Keep Corbyn rally in Brighton in support of Jeremy Corbyn's campaign in the Labour Party leadership election. On 20 April 2019, Connolly auditioned in the character of Barbara Nice on the television programme Britain's Got Talent. She made it to the live shows, however, she was later eliminated in the fifth semi-final.

Other roles
Janice Connolly was part of the Birmingham independent music scene in the late 1970s and early 1980s. She performed with "The Surprises" and "The Evereadies" playing regularly in Moseley at The Fighting Cocks. Singles championed by John Peel included "Jeremy Thorpe is Innocent" and "Martian Girlfriend". Other local bands active at the time included UB40 who played as support band for the Evereadies at one point.

Connolly was performing as Barbara Nice at the Palace nightclub in Levenshulme in 1997 when spotted by Peter Kay at the finals of the Manchester Evening News New Act of the Year and went on to appear in several of his television shows. She played Holy Mary in Phoenix Nights, a part Dave Spikey claimed he wrote with her in mind and which was reprised in Max and Paddy's Road to Nowhere written by Kay and Paddy McGuinness. She also played Mrs Bamforth in That Peter Kay Thing.

Her other television work includes playing Carole in Dave Spikey's Dead Man Weds and appearing twice in Coronation Street as Dolly Gartside and Sheila Wheeler. Connolly is the artistic director and founder member of Birmingham-based Women and Theatre. The company is committed to social change through new theatre and drama and in its mission statement states that it aims to make heard the voices of those who are not usually listened to. The company performs in a variety of settings including schools, arts centres, health centres and conference halls. She ran the 'Laughing for a Change' project, funded by Time to Change, which encouraged comedians and audiences to talk about mental health; this culminated in a stand-up tour in 2014 featuring Seymour Mace, Rob Deering and others.

In October 2015, Connolly appeared in the stage adaptation of Meera Syal's novel Anita and Me at the Birmingham Rep, for which she was acclaimed for her "comic talent". Further stage appearances have included Birmingham Comedy Festival's Lost Hancocks: Vacant Lot (2017-2018). and Prime Time (2019). In 2022, she portrayed Rosie Colton in the BBC soap opera Doctors.

Personal life
Connolly is married with two children and lives in Kings Heath, Birmingham.

In 2017, she appeared in the New Years Honours list in recognition of her contribution to community arts through her work with Women and Theatre. She was awarded a British Empire Medal.

References

External links
Barbara Nice on Chortle

1954 births
Britain's Got Talent contestants
Comedians from Birmingham, West Midlands
English soap opera actresses
English television actresses
English women comedians
Living people
Recipients of the British Empire Medal